Leipzig-Stötteritz is a railway station in the city of Leipzig, Germany. The station opened on 1 December 1891 and is located on the Leipzig Hbf–Leipzig-Connewitz and Leipzig-Engelsdorf–Leipzig-Connewitz railways. Since December 2013 the station is served by the S-Bahn Mitteldeutschland, with train services operated by DB Regio.

The station was rebuilt and modernised from October 2011, in preparation for the S-Bahn Mitteldeutschland. This included the building of lifts, to make the station accessible to all.

Train services
S-Bahn Mitteldeutschland services currently call at the station.

References

Stotteritz
Railway stations in Germany opened in 1893